Nokia 5500 Sport is a smartphone running Symbian v9.1 operating system and the S60 3rd Edition user interface, announced on May 10, 2006. This was the first Nokia handset ever to feature text to speech and motion sensor features.

Features include:

   Built-in 3D accelerometer: allows phone to act as pedometer/step counter.
   Swap key for quick one-key switching between phone, music, and sports modes.
   Stainless steel body: Built to resist knocks, dust and water splashes.
   Text to speech: Software to read aloud SMS and exercise data.
   Sports tracking: plans, records, and schedules workout sessions.
   Music: Unique tap commands for playing MP3 files.
   Integrated 2-megapixel camera with 4x digital zoom.

Nokia 5500 Sport Music Edition
Nokia 5500 Sport Music Edition or XpressMusic announced in October 2006 is the music variant model of the Nokia 5500 Sport Model in different color scheme. Its sales package includes added accessories, such as a higher capacity memory card, bike mount and shoulder bag. Apart from that its identical hardware wise to the Nokia 5500 Sport Edition.

Specifications sheet

Known issues
Some users have complained on the Nokia Support Discussions Board that the Nokia 5500 keypad gets unglued only after a few weeks of light usage, however later release models appear to have had this problem fixed.

See also
 List of Nokia products
 Nokia Series 60
 Smartphone
 Symbian

References

External links 
  Nokia 5500 Sport Official Product page 
  Nokia 5500 Sport - Device Details
  Nokia 5500 Sport - Resource Information
  Nokia 5500 Sport - Phone support
  Nokia 5500 Sport XpressMusic - Promotional Campaign

Reviews, photos and videos 
 Nokia 5500 Sport - International review roundup by global review aggregator alaTEST
 Nokia 5500 Sport - Review by Mobile-Review
 Nokia 5500 Sport - Review by GSM Arena, Video
 Nokia 5500 Sport - Review by All About Symbian, Videocast
 Nokia 5500 Sport - Review by MobileBurn.com
 Nokia 5500 Sport - Review by iMobile.com.au
 Nokia 5500 Sport - CNET Reviews: CNET Australia, CNET U.K.
 Nokia 5500 Sport - Review by Pocket Gamer
 Nokia 5500 Sport - Review by TrustedReviews
 Nokia 5500 Sport - Review by Tech2.com India 
 Nokia 5500 Sport - Durability Test by MForum.ru (Videos)
 Nokia 5500 Sport - Comments on Nokia 5500 (Turkish)

Nokia smartphones
Mobile phones with infrared transmitter